Ole Degnæs (29 June 1877 – 27 May 1943) was a Norwegian sport shooter. He was born in Årjäng in Värmland, Sweden. He competed in team rifle at the 1912 Summer Olympics in Stockholm, where Norwegian team placed sixth.

References

1877 births
1943 deaths
People from Årjäng Municipality
Norwegian male sport shooters
Olympic shooters of Norway
Shooters at the 1912 Summer Olympics